Larry Rountree III (born February 13, 1999) is an American football running back for the Los Angeles Chargers of the National Football League (NFL). He played college football at Missouri.

Early years
Rountree attended Millbrook High School in Raleigh, North Carolina. As a senior, he ran for 1,147 yards on 201 carries with 21 touchdowns. He committed to the University of Missouri to play college football.

College career
As a true freshman at Missouri in 2017, Rountree played in all 13 games and rushed for 703 yards on 126 carries with six touchdowns. As a sophomore he became the starting running back, rushing 225 times for 1,216 yards and 11 touchdowns. As a junior, he rushed for 829 yards on 186 carries and nine touchdowns. Rountree returned to Missouri his senior year in 2020. During the season, he rushed for 972 yards and set the school record for career rushing yards (3,720) by a running back.

Professional career
Rountree was selected in the sixth round (198th overall) in the 2021 NFL Draft by the Los Angeles Chargers.

He scored his first NFL touchdown, on a 1 yard rush, in the week 10 game of the 2021 season against the Minnesota Vikings.

On August 31, 2022, Rountree was waived by the Chargers and re-signed to the practice squad. He was promoted to the active roster on November 12, 2022. He was waived on November 26 and re-signed to the practice squad. He signed a reserve/future contract on January 17, 2023.

References

External links
Los Angeles Chargers bio
Missouri Tigers bio

1999 births
Living people
American football running backs
Los Angeles Chargers players
Missouri Tigers football players
Players of American football from Raleigh, North Carolina